Corbula is a genus of very small saltwater clams, marine bivalve molluscs in the family Corbulidae, the basket clams.

Species
Species within the genus Corbula include:

 Corbula aequivalvis Philippi, 1836
 Corbula albuginosa Hinds, 1843
 Corbula amethystina (Olsson, 1961)
 Corbula arcaeformis Lynge, 1909
 Corbula barrattiana C. B. Adams, 1852   
 Corbula bicarinata (Sowerby, 1833)
 Corbula biradiata (Sowerby, 1833)
 Corbula cadenati (Nicklès, 1955)
 Corbula chittyana C. B. Adams, 1852
 Corbula colimensis Coan, 2002
 Corbula contracta Say, 1822
 Corbula crispa Reeve, 1844
 Corbula cymella Dall, 1881
 Corbula dautzenbergi Lamy, 1941
 Corbula densesculpta Thiele & Jaeckel, 1931
 Corbula dietziana C. B. Adams, 1852
 Corbula erythraeensis H. Adams, 1871
 Corbula erythrodon Lamarck, 1818
 Corbula esmeralda (Olsson, 1961)
 Corbula fortisulcata E.A. Smith, 1879
 Corbula gibba (Olivi, 1792)
 Corbula granum Cosel, 1995
 Corbula grovesi Coan, 2002
 Corbula hydropica (Iredale, 1930)
 Corbula ira Dall, 1908
 Corbula laticostata Lamy, 1941
 Corbula limatula Conrad, 1846
 Corbula lineata Lynge, 1909
 Corbula luteola Carpenter, 1864
 Corbula lyrata Sastry & Mamgain, 1971
 Corbula macgillivrayi E.A. Smith, 1885
 Corbula marmorata Hinds, 1843
 Corbula modesta Hinds
 Corbula monilis Hinds, 1843
 Corbula moretonensis Lamprell & Healy, 1997
 Corbula nasuta Sowerby, 1833
 Corbula niasensis Thiele & Jaeckel, 1931
 Corbula nipponica (Habe, 1961)
 Corbula obesa Hinds, 1843
 Corbula operculata Philippi, 1848
 Corbula otra Coan, 2002
 Corbula ovalina Lamarck, 1818
 Corbula ovulata G.B. Sowerby I, 1833
 Corbula pallida Reeve, 1843
 Corbula patagonica d'Orbigny, 1845
 Corbula persica E.A. Smith, 1906
 Corbula philippii E.A. Smith, 1885
 Corbula physoides Deshayes, 1848
 Corbula porcella Dall, 1916
 Corbula pulchella Philippi, 1893
 Corbula rotalis Hinds, 1843
 Corbula rugifera Smith
 Corbula scaphoides Hinds, 1843
 Corbula sinensis Bernard, Cai & Morton, 1993
 Corbula smithiana Brazier, 1880
 Corbula solidula Hinds, 1843
 Corbula speciosa Reeve, 1843
 Corbula stephensoni Lamprell & Healy, 1997
 Corbula striatissima Lamy, 1941
 Corbula subquadrata Melvill & Standen, 1907
 Corbula sulcata Lamarck, 1801
 Corbula sulcosa
 Corbula sulculosa H. Adams, 1870
 Corbula swiftiana C. B. Adams, 1852
 Corbula taitensis Lamarck, 1818
 Corbula tenuis G.B. Sowerby I, 1833
 Corbula tryoni E.A. Smith, 1880
 Corbula tunicata Reeve, 1843
 Corbula uruguayensis W. B. Marshall, 1928
 Corbula venusta Gould, 1861
 Corbula yokoyamai (Habe, 1949)
 Corbula zelandica Quoy and Gaimard, 1835

The database ITIS also gives the following species 
 Corbula alabamiensis Lea, 1833    
 Corbula caribaea
 Corbula cubaniana d'Orbigny, 1842
 Corbula kelseyi Dall, 1916
 Corbula krebsiana C. B. Adams, 1852
 Corbula nuciformis Sowerby, 1833

References

 Huber M. (2010). Compendium of bivalves. A full-color guide to 3,300 of the World’s Marine Bivalves. A status on Bivalvia after 250 years of research. ConchBooks, Hackenheim, Germany. Pp. 901, 1 CD.

Corbulidae
Bivalve genera